Nova Group may refer to:

 Nova (eikaiwa) - a private English teaching company in Japan
 Nova Group (metro) - a group of small to medium-sized metros